Sonic Sum is an American hip hop group based in Bronx, New York. It consists of Rob Sonic, Fred Ones, Eric M.O., and Preservation. The group was described by CMJ New Music Monthly as "hip-hop's Radiohead".

In 1999, Sonic Sum released the first studio album, The Sanity Annex, on Ozone Music. It has received critical acclaim worldwide. XLR8R called it "one of the most criminally slept-on albums of the indie hip-hop boom". In 2002, the group released the second studio album, Films, exclusively in Japan. It was released in the US in 2004 and released on Definitive Jux in 2008.

Discography
Studio albums
 The Sanity Annex (1999)
 Films (2004)
EPs
 Plaster Man (2002)
 Operazor (2003)

Singles
 "Downtown Maze" / "Skypirate" (1998)
 "Callarama Gala" / "Flatlands" (1999)
 "Himbro St." / "It's an Ashtray" (2000)
 "Rocket" / "Oscillator" (2001)
 "Films" (2003)

References

External links
 

Alternative hip hop groups
Definitive Jux artists
East Coast hip hop groups
Musical quartets
Musical groups from the Bronx